The 2011 Time Warner Cable Road Race Showcase was held at Road America on August 20, 2011. It was the sixth round of the 2011 American Le Mans Series season.

Qualifying

Qualifying Result
Pole position winners in each class are marked in bold.

Race

Race result
Class winners in bold.  Cars failing to complete 70% of their class winner's distance are marked as Not Classified (NC).

References

Road America
Road America 500
Road Race Showcase